MV Ulster Monarch was a passenger ferry operated across the Irish Sea between 1929 and 1966 apart from wartime service as an infantry landing ship, HMS Ulster Monarch.

History
Ulster Monarch was the first of  three 3700ton motorships built by Harland and Wolff for the Belfast Steamship Co. between 1929 and 1930. Her original grey hull was later changed to black.

Ulster Monarch was requisitioned by Admiralty in October 1940, initially as a stores carrier. In 1942, she was converted into an infantry landing ship. HMS Ulster Monarch (F69) carried six Landing Craft Assault craft and was able to transport up to 580 troops. She was armed with a 12pdr, 2 2pdr and 4 20mm anti-aircraft guns.

Ulster Monarchs war record included a circumnavigation of Africa. She took part in the first landing of troops on the Italian mainland and the D-Day landings. She was part of convoy WS 11X, a troop convoy from Liverpool / Clyde to Gibraltar preparing for Operation Halberd.

The ship was returned to her owners in October 1945, the only one of the trio to resume the Irish Sea service after the war. Her funnels were shortened in an attempt to improve stability by reducing top weight. She continued in service until shortly before being broken up at Ghent, Belgium in 1966.

Service
Liverpool - Belfast (1929 - 1940)
wartime service
Liverpool - Belfast (1946 - 1966)

References

Ferries of the United Kingdom
1929 ships
Ships built by Harland and Wolff
Troop ships of the United Kingdom